On the night of Wednesday, June 21, 1905, the New York Central Railroad's flagship passenger train, the 20th Century Limited, derailed in Mentor, Ohio, on the Lake Shore and Michigan Southern Railway line, killing 21 passengers and injuring more than 25 others on board. A switch from the mainline to a freight siding was open, causing the Limited to leave the mainline and overrun the siding at high speed. The cause of the accident was never officially determined, but overwhelming evidence points to an act of rail sabotage. The 20th Century Limited connected New York City to Chicago; its running time had just weeks earlier been reduced from 20 hours to 18.

Incident

On June 21, 1905, Train No. 26, the 20th Century Limited, was approaching the town of Mentor from the west, running on a mainline owned by the Lake Shore and Michigan Southern Railway. Conflicting reports exist as to whether the train was running behind schedule, but it  was crowded, with 67 passengers on board. At 9:20 p.m. The high speed of the consist mixed with the short length of the siding allowed no time to prevent the accident. The engine canted over onto its left side, ejecting fireman Aaron Gorham from his position and fatally crushing the engineer at the throttle. The engine plowed through a Lake Shore and Michigan Southern Railway freight depot, and its boiler exploded. A Chicago sleeping car immediately behind the locomotive telescoped into the tender, and caught fire in the resulting explosion. The second car, a combination car, landed atop the carnage and was destroyed. The third car, another sleeper, left the track. No other cars derailed in the crash.

Rescuers responded almost immediately, but the heat from the fire prevented close approach. The ensuing fire burned for four or five hours, not being contained until midnight (EDT) on June 22. Physicians came from as far as Cleveland and as nearby as Painesville to offer aid. Ultimately, 21 passengers were killed in the wreck or the fire, most burned beyond recognition. Five were seriously injured, and "more than a score" were less seriously injured. Some of the injured were placed aboard a relief train that took them to Cleveland, and others placed in ambulances that rushed to nearby hospitals. The last body was pulled from the wreckage at about 1 a.m. on June 22. One of those killed was C.H. Wellman, who had a friend in Mentor by the name of Horace Andrews, the president of the Cleveland Electric Railway Company. Andrews was summoned to the accident site, just in time to receive a final message from Wellman for his wife.

Investigation

The media speculated that the train had been running at an unsafe speed, but investigation indicated otherwise. It was found that 50 minutes before the Limited had arrived in Mentor, Train No. 10 from Chicago to Boston had passed through the switch without fault, and no other trains had since come through. Alex Hammond, the conductor of the Limited, inspected the switch shortly after the disaster, and found that it was set and locked for the sidetrack. Also, a white light showing the positioning of the track was found to be in the "clear" position, which was supposed to indicate that the points were set for the mainline. With this evidence, the New York Central Railroad insisted that the accident was the result of willful misplacement of the switch by an unknown party. After an investigation, Assistant General Superintendent D.C. Moon of the Lake Shore and Michigan Southern issued a statement that corroborated this belief, stating that he was "satisfied that somebody, with a key, opened the switch with malicious intent. The train did not jump the track." Despite efforts, no party was ever found at fault and to this day, the official cause of the accident is undetermined.

Aftermath
The Lake Shore and Michigan Southern Railway rebuilt its freight depot in 1909; it exists today. Directly opposite the freight depot, the former Mentor railroad station at the corner of Station and Hart Streets, became New York Central property when it merged with the LS&MS in 1914. Passenger service to Mentor ended in 1949, and as of August 2007 the station was occupied by Deekers Side Tracks, a sports bar.

See also

1939 City of San Francisco derailment
1995 Palo Verde, Arizona derailment
1905 in rail transport
Lists of rail accidents
List of rail accidents (1900–1909)
List of unsolved murders

References

External links
 Newspaper clipping featuring a list of the dead and injured (website currently down due to hacking incident, will return at unspecified time)

1905 in Ohio
1905 crimes in the United States
Accidents and incidents involving New York Central Railroad
Derailments in the United States
June 1905 events
Railway accidents and incidents in Ohio
Railway accidents in 1905
Terrorist incidents by unknown perpetrators
Train wrecks caused by sabotage
Transportation in Ohio
Unsolved mass murders in the United States